Phormidium aerugineo-caeruleum is a species of cyanobacteria in the genus Phormidium.

References 

aerugineo-caeruleum